RCRS may refer to:
 The revised Cambridge Reference Sequence of human mitochondrial DNA
 The Radio Control Radio Service in the United States used for control of model boat, cars, and aircraft
 Russian Circuit Racing Series, a touring car competition